The Hôtel d'Arbaud-Jouques is a listed hôtel particulier in Aix-en-Provence.

Location
It is located at 19, Cours Mirabeau in Aix-en-Provence.

History
The widow of Jacques Arbaud purchased the left-side Hôtel de Valbelle-Meyrargues in 1695 and her son André-Elzéard d'Arbaud de Jouques (1676-1744) purchased the right-side Hôtel de Séguiran some time later. They were converted in one hôtel particulier in 1732: the hôtel d'Arbaud-Jouques by the architect Jean-Baptiste Franque (1683-1758). His son Joseph Charles André d'Arbaud de Jouques (1769-1849) and his brother also lived here.

King Charles IV of Spain (1748–1819) stayed here as a guest in 1812.

Heritage significance
It has been listed as a monument historique since 1990.

References

Hôtels particuliers in Aix-en-Provence
Houses completed in 1732
Monuments historiques of Aix-en-Provence